Cultwo Show (lit. Escape at 2pm, Cultwo Show) is a South Korean radio show hosted by Jung Chan-woo and Kim Tae-gyun (Cultwo) on SBS Power FM (frequency 107.7 MHz) since May 1, 2006 from 2:00 pm to 4:00 pm. From the beginning the broadcast is being conducted in front of the audience.

Unlike other radio stations that proceed quietly and introduce songs, they have become very popular due to the candid and ingenious stories and original corners. Recently the audience has been engaged in various corners. This is the program that is currently ranked # 1 in radio listening.

Awards and nominations

References

External links
 

South Korean talk radio programs
Seoul Broadcasting System